Robodemons is an action video game with shooting elements that was released for the Nintendo Entertainment System by Color Dreams on December 20, 1989. Like all Color Dreams games, Robodemons was not officially licensed by Nintendo.

Gameplay

According to the game's instruction manual, the player controls a boomerang-wielding hero whose mission is to destroy the robotic demon army of the evil king Kull. There are seven levels in Robodemons, which are titled the "levels of" Bone, Flesh, Fire, Condemned Souls, Demon's Quarters, Robodemon Factory and Kull's Palace.

Unlike most Color Dreams games which featured heavy religious/Christian themes, Robodemons contains very Satanic and occult themes. It contains allusions/references to Limbo, Hell, Death, Hades and Satan. The level structure is similar to passages found in the Divine Comedy.

References

External links
Instruction Manual

Unauthorized video games
1989 video games
Dark fantasy video games
Science fantasy video games
Nintendo Entertainment System games
Nintendo Entertainment System-only games
North America-exclusive video games
Side-scrolling video games
Color Dreams games
Video games developed in the United States

Video games about demons
Single-player video games
Video games about robots